Space-themed music is any music, from any genre or style, with lyrics or titles relating to outer space or spaceflight.

Songs or other musical forms influenced by the concept of outer space have appeared in music throughout history, both in instrumental and vocal pieces with lyrics. As early as Ancient Greece, Pythagoras believed in something called the "harmony of the spheres". He believed that since planets and the stars all moved in the universe according to mathematical equations that these mathematical equations could be translated into musical notes and thus produce a symphony.  This idea was explored further throughout Western history under the theories of Musica universalis. Some more recent and widely different examples are The Planets by Gustav Holst, and the song "Space Oddity" by David Bowie. Outer space also appears as a theme in "Space Age" retro pop music, such as Stereolab's Space-Age Bachelor Pad Music.

Music about outer space attracts enthusiastic listeners from all walks of life. Some have created web pages to share their interests. NASA, JPL, and the US Governmental Centennial of Flight Commission even have a webpages showcasing and discussing music about outer space.  One useful example of such a web-based list is by astronomer Andrew Fraknoi; see under External Links, below, "A Catalog of Music Inspired by Serious Astronomy."

Music about outer space 
In 1777 was the première of the opera "Il mondo della luna"("The world on the moon"), by Joseph Haydn. 

In 1875 was the premiere of the opera~féerie spectacle "Le voyage dans la Lune"("A trip to the moon") by Jacques Offenbach.

In 1958, Karl-Birger Blomdahl composed an opera Aniara to a libretto by Erik Lindegren based on the poem Aniara by Harry Martinson, a tragedy set aboard a space ship.

In 1958, Russ Garcia recorded an exotica album called Fantastica on Capitol Records that was about space travel. 

In 1966 Barry Gray wrote several space music pieces for the science fiction-film Thunderbirds Are Go.

In 1969, The Beatles released single "Across the Universe".

In 1972, Elton John released single "Rocket Man".

The same year Hawkwind recorded and released the song "Space is Deep" and then performed their Space Ritual which was an opera about a crew of astronauts dreaming in hibernation. 

Also in 1972 Tangerine Dream released their double album Zeit, featuring space-related track titles such as Birth of Liquid Plejades and Nebulous Dawn, as well as cover art depicting a solar eclipse. It is considered one of the first (possibly the first) Dark ambient albums.

Eduard Artemyev has made space-themed music, for example for a space film Solaris (1972), although his best known and successfully covered space-themed sounding piece might be the theme song for non-space film Siberiade (1979).

In 1973, Montrose released "Space Station #5" as a single from their self-titled debut album. The song was covered by Iron Maiden in 1992. For Montrose's followup album in 1974, Paper Money, they recorded "Spaceage Sacrifice" and the instrumental "Starliner". Montrose's first lead singer, Sammy Hagar, went on to record the title track of his album Marching to Mars, which was released in 1997.

In 1975, the song "'39" was released on the album A Night at the Opera by Queen. The song relates the voyage of 20 volunteers to another star system. While the volunteers perceive the trip as being only a year, 100 years pass on Earth as a consequence of time dilation as described by Einstein's theory of special relativity, and, consequently, return to find their loved ones either no longer alive or of advanced age. The song was written and sung by Brian May, who went on to complete his PhD in astrophysics in 2008, with backing vocals sung by Freddie Mercury and Roger Taylor.

The Japanese musician Isao Tomita has produced many albums with space-based themes, such as The Planets (1976), his version of Holst's suite; Kosmos (1978); Bermuda Triangle (1979); Dawn Chorus (Canon of the Three Stars) (1984); Space Walk – Impressions Of An Astronaut (compilation, 1984); Mind of the Universe – Live at Linz (1985); Back to the Earth – Live in New York (1988); and Nasca Fantasy (supporting Kodo, 1994).

The Vangelis album Albedo 0.39 (1976) is entirely devoted to space, while a segment of Heaven and Hell (1975) was used as the theme to the PBS television series Cosmos by Carl Sagan. His work Mythodea: Music for NASA's Mars Odyssey Mission is reflective of his interest in space exploration. 

Jean-Michel Jarre's 1986 album Rendez-Vous finished with "Last Rendez-Vous (Ron's Piece)", which was intended to have had a saxophone part played by astronaut Ron McNair, while aboard the Space Shuttle Challenger. This would have been the first piece of music recorded in space. However, the Space Shuttle Challenger disaster ended this possibility. The track was subsequently dedicated to McNair and the rest of the Challenger crew. In 1983, Jarre had recorded "Moon Machine". This was also released in 1986, but as a 12" single B-side.

Mike Oldfield's 1994 album The Songs of Distant Earth was based on Arthur C. Clarke's SF novel Songs of Distant Earth.  Pop songs also mention outer space, such as Chris de Burgh's "A Spaceman Came Travelling", the Bonzo Dog Band's "I'm the Urban Spaceman", David Bowie's "Space Oddity", Elton John's "Rocket Man", "Major Tom (Coming Home)" by Peter Schilling, and Deep Purple's "Space Truckin'".  To Our Children's Children's Children by The Moody Blues was a 1969 album inspired by spaceflight.

Several albums have featured music inspired by the Apollo space program.  In 1983, Brian Eno with his brother Roger Eno and producer/recording artist Daniel Lanois, composed the score for the film For All Mankind, a documentary of NASA's Apollo program; an album of the music, Apollo: Atmospheres and Soundtracks, was later released.  On The Orb's 1991 two-disc debut album, Adventures Beyond the Ultraworld, disc one of  features an ambient musical simulation of the Apollo 11 moon journey, including excerpts of NASA recordings of the radio conversations between Mission Control and the astronauts in space. To commemorate the 50th anniversary of the moon landing, Julianne Regan and Tim Bricheno of All About Eve, released a video and song called Pale Blue Earth.

The filk anthology albums Minus Ten and Counting (1983) and To Touch the Stars (2003) celebrate and promote the exploration of outer space.

Author and classical music critic David Hurwitz describes Joseph Haydn's choral and chamber orchestra piece, The Creation, composed in 1798, as space music, both in the sense of the sound of the music, ("a genuine piece of 'space music' featuring softly pulsating high violins and winds above low cellos and basses, with nothing at all in the middle ... The space music gradually drifts towards a return to the movement's opening gesture ...  "); and in the manner of its composition, relating that Haydn conceived The Creation after discussing music and astronomy with William Herschel, oboist and astronomer (discoverer of the planet Uranus).

In 2016, Avenged Sevenfold released their album, The Stage, a concept album about space, the universe, the human race, and artificial intelligence. The song "Exist" contains a spoken word section written and performed by astrophysicist Neil deGrasse Tyson.

Another band to use space as musical inspiration is the Christian "Astro-Rock" group Brave Saint Saturn, whose three albums, So Far from Home, The Light of Things Hoped For, and Anti-Meridian, form a trilogy that chronicles the journey of the fictional spaceship, the USS Gloria, on a trip to survey the moons of Saturn. The music uses space narratives, lingo, samples and quotes to portray the journey.

Soundtracks for films and television shows about outer space

Soundtracks of science fiction films and television and radio series often feature music associated with outer space, such as Star Wars, Star Trek, Doctor Who, The Hitchhiker's Guide to the Galaxy, Red Dwarf, The X-Files, and others.

The theremin is an electronic musical instrument associated with a very eerie sound, which has led to its use in movie soundtracks such as those in The Day the Earth Stood Still.

Music played in planetariums and observatories

Many forms of music are used in observatory and planetarium shows, particularly genres such as electronic music, classical music, space music, and space rock.  Some artists, such as Geodesium, specialize in creating custom music for Planetariums.

During the 1970s, IMAX's OMNIMAX (now IMAX Dome) film system was conceived to operate on planetarium screens. More recently, some planetariums have re-branded themselves as "dome theaters," with broader offerings including wide-screen or "wraparound" films, fulldome video, and laser shows that combine music with laser-drawn patterns.

Music made with sounds of outer space

Energy sources in the atmosphere, such as lightning, can produce sounds (sferics, tweeks, and whistlers) in the very low frequency (VLF) radio band.

Objects in space – the Sun, planets, stars, quasars, pulsars, galaxies, and active galaxies – all produce signals that, if received (usually through radio astronomy dishes and processed), can be used by a musician as the basis for any kind of composition imaginable. 

Scientists with an interest in space-based sounds include:
 Don Gurnett.
 .
 Alexander Kosovichev, a Stanford scientist whose researches into the Sun's oscillations (and who uploaded the sounds to the net) encouraged Stephen Taylor (see below) to create his album.
 Dr. Fiorella Terenzi has created several works that use sounds derived from celestial radio signals homepage, Space.com entry.
 NASA produced a CD in 1992 from Voyager 1 & 2 recordings of electromagnetic fields processed with digital sampling techniques.
Artists/bands who have included space sounds in their works include:
 Hawkwind
 Terry Riley, along with the Kronos Quartet, in their album Sun Rings, which used "sounds of the planets recorded by the Voyager mission on its journey to deep space" .
 Stephen Taylor, in the album The Heart of the Sun.
 Robert Schroeder's album Galaxie Cygnus-A used interstellar noise from the distant galaxy in the title 
 Billy Yfantis, used sounds recorded on Mars in the track "Landing" (Album: Entering the Solar System).

References

External links
The Musical Sounds of Space – NPR Arts & Culture 
Catalog of Music Inspired by Serious Astronomy
Music Space – Listening to the cosmos ...
From outer space, music of peace – Providence Journal

Lon Strickland's space-themed synth-pop album

Music genres
Spaceflight